Night is an album by guitarist John Abercrombie recorded in 1984 and released on the ECM label.

Reception
The Allmusic review by Daniel Gioffre awarded the album 4½ stars, stating, "This record is the kind of album that one would like to hear while enjoying a late-night cigarette on the roof of a Manhattan apartment. Moody, atmospheric, and beautiful".  The Penguin Guide to Jazz awarded the album 3 stars, stating, "Night demonstrated two things: first, that Abercrombie had outgrown the association with Hammer in particular, probably because increasingly he could give those evocative keyboard figures his own spin, using pedals and later, guitar synth; and secondly, that he never sounds entirely easy in the company of a horn player whose main strength is rapid fire changes".

Track listing

Personnel
 John Abercrombie – guitar
 Michael Brecker – tenor saxophone
 Jan Hammer – keyboards
 Jack DeJohnette – drums

References

ECM Records albums
John Abercrombie (guitarist) albums
1984 albums
Albums produced by Manfred Eicher